Gallaecimonas xiamenensis  is a Gram-negative, rod-shaped and motile bacterium from the genus of Gallaecimonas which has been isolated from seawater near the Xiamen Island in China.

References

 

Gammaproteobacteria
Bacteria described in 2013